Tudar may refer to:
 Tudar, Azerbaijan, a village
 Tudar, Iran, a village
 Tudar, Mazandaran, Iran, a village

See also
 Tudar Molla, Iran
 Tudar-e Ruteh, Iran
 Tudar-e Samadi, Iran
 Tidar (disambiguation), Iran